Anthemis is a genus of aromatic flowering plants in the family Asteraceae, closely related to Chamaemelum, and like that genus, known by the common name chamomile; some species are also called dog-fennel or mayweed. Anthemis are native to the Mediterranean region and southwest Asia east to Iran. A number of species have also become naturalized in the United Kingdom and other parts of the world.

There are around 100 species within this genus. 

Anthemis species are used as food plants by the larvae of some Lepidoptera species including Orthonama obstipata (The Gem) and Bucculatrix anthemidella, a leaf-miner which feeds exclusively on Anthemis tinctoria.

Cultivation and uses
Several species and cultivars are available for garden use.  A. punctata subsp. cupaniana and Anthemis tinctoria 'E.C. Buxton' have gained the Royal Horticultural Society's Award of Garden Merit.

Species
The following species are accepted:

Anthemis aaronsohnii Eig
Anthemis abrotanifolia (Willd.) Guss.
Anthemis abylaea (Font Quer & Maire) Oberpr.
Anthemis aciphylla Boiss.
Anthemis adonidifolia Boiss.
Anthemis aeolica Lojac.
Anthemis aetnensis Spreng.
Anthemis alpestris (Hoffmanns. & Link) R.Fernandes
Anthemis ammanthus Greuter
Anthemis ammophila Boiss. & Heldr.
Anthemis anthemiformis (Freyn & Sint.) Grierson
Anthemis arenicola Boiss.
Anthemis argyrophylla Velen.
Anthemis arvensis L.
Anthemis atropatana Iranshahr
Anthemis auriculata Boiss.
Anthemis austroiranica Rech.f., Aellen & Esfand.
Anthemis × bollei Sch.Bip. ex Asch.
Anthemis bornmuelleri Stoj. & Acht.
Anthemis bourgei Boiss. & Reut.
Anthemis boveana J.Gay
Anthemis brachycarpa Eig
Anthemis brachystephana Bornm. & Gauba
Anthemis breviradiata Eig
Anthemis bushehrica Iranshahr
Anthemis candidissima Willd. ex Spreng.
Anthemis chia L.
Anthemis chrysantha J.Gay
Anthemis concolor Lojac.
Anthemis confusa Pomel
Anthemis cornucopiae Boiss.
Anthemis corymbulosa Boiss. & Hausskn.
Anthemis cotula L.
Anthemis cretica L.
Anthemis cuneata Hub.-Mor. & Reese
Anthemis cupaniana Tod. ex Nyman
Anthemis cyrenaica Coss.
Anthemis davisii Yavin
Anthemis deserti Boiss.
Anthemis deserticola Krasch. & Popov
Anthemis dicksoniae Ghafoor
Anthemis didymaea Mouterde
Anthemis edumea Eig
Anthemis emasensis Eig
Anthemis fayedina Zareh
Anthemis filicaulis (Boiss. & Heldr.) Greuter
Anthemis fimbriata Boiss.
Anthemis freitagii Iranshahr
Anthemis fumariifolia Boiss.
Anthemis fungosa Boiss. & Hausskn.
Anthemis funkii (Sch.Bip. ex Willk. & Lange) Benedí
Anthemis gharbensis Oberpr.
Anthemis gilanica Bornm. & Gauba
Anthemis gillettii Iranshahr
Anthemis glaberrima (Rech.f.) Greuter
Anthemis glareosa E.Durand & Barratte
Anthemis gracilis Iranshahr
Anthemis hamrinensis Iranshahr
Anthemis handel-mazzettii Eig
Anthemis haussknechtii Boiss. & Reut.
Anthemis hebronica Boiss. & Kotschy
Anthemis hemistephana Boiss.
Anthemis hermonis Eig
Anthemis hirtella C.Winkl.
Anthemis homalolepis Eig
Anthemis hyalina DC.
Anthemis hydruntina E.Groves
Anthemis indurata Delile
Anthemis iranica Parsa
Anthemis ismelia Lojac.
Anthemis jordanovii Stoj. & Acht.
Anthemis kandaharica Iranshahr
Anthemis karacae Güner
Anthemis kermanica Parsa
Anthemis kitaibelii Spreng.
Anthemis kotschyana Boiss.
Anthemis kruegeriana Pamp.
Anthemis laconica Franzén
Anthemis leptophylla Eig
Anthemis leucanthemifolia Boiss. & C.I.Blanche
Anthemis leucolepis Eig
Anthemis lithuanica Besser ex DC.
Anthemis lorestanica Iranshahr
Anthemis macedonica Boiss. & Orph.
Anthemis macrotis (Rech.f.) Oberpr. & Vogt
Anthemis maris-mortui Eig
Anthemis maritima L.
Anthemis marocana Batt. & Pit.
Anthemis mauritiana Maire & Sennen
Anthemis melampodina Delile
Anthemis melanacme Boiss. & Hausskn.
Anthemis micrantha Boiss. & Hausskn.
Anthemis microcephala (Schrenk) B.Fedtsch.
Anthemis microlepis Eig
Anthemis microsperma Boiss. & Kotschy
Anthemis mirheydari Iranshahr
Anthemis moghanica Iranshahr
Anthemis monilicostata Pomel
Anthemis muricata (DC.) Guss.
Anthemis nabataea Eig
Anthemis odontostephana Boiss.
Anthemis orbelica Pancic
Anthemis orientalis (L.) Degen
Anthemis parnesia Boiss. & Heldr.
Anthemis parvifolia Eig
Anthemis patentissima Eig
Anthemis pauciloba Boiss.
Anthemis pedunculata Desf.
Anthemis peregrina L.
Anthemis persica Boiss.
Anthemis pignattiorum Guarino, Raimondo & Domina
Anthemis pindicola Heldr. ex Halácsy
Anthemis plebeia Boiss. & Noë
Anthemis plutonia Meikle
Anthemis pseudocotula Boiss.
Anthemis pulvinata Brullo, Scelsi & Spamp.
Anthemis punctata Vahl
Anthemis pungens Yavin
Anthemis rascheyana Boiss.
Anthemis regis-borisii Stoj. & Acht.
Anthemis retusa Delile
Anthemis rhodensis Boiss.
Anthemis rhodocentra Iranshahr
Anthemis rigida Boiss. ex Heldr.
Anthemis rosea Sm.
Anthemis rumelica (Velen.) Stoj. & Acht.
Anthemis ruthenica M.Bieb.
Anthemis samariensis Turland
Anthemis scariosa Banks & Sol.
Anthemis schizostephana Boiss. & Hausskn.
Anthemis scopulorum Rech.f.
Anthemis scrobicularis Yavin
Anthemis secundiramea Biv.
Anthemis sheilae Ghafoor & Al-Turki
Anthemis sibthorpii Griseb.
Anthemis sintenisii Freyn
Anthemis spruneri Boiss. & Heldr.
Anthemis sterilis Steven
Anthemis stiparum Pomel
Anthemis susiana Nábelek
Anthemis taubertii E.Durand & Barratte
Anthemis tenuicarpa Eig
Anthemis tenuisecta Ball
Anthemis tigreensis J.Gay ex A.Rich.
Anthemis tomentella Greuter
Anthemis tomentosa L.
Anthemis tranzscheliana Fed.
Anthemis tricolor Boiss.
Anthemis tricornis Eig
Anthemis tripolitana Boiss. & C.I.Blanche
Anthemis tubicina Boiss. & Hausskn.
Anthemis ubensis Pomel
Anthemis virescens Velen.
Anthemis wallii Hub.-Mor. & Reese
Anthemis wettsteiniana Hand.-Mazz.
Anthemis xylopoda O.Schwarz
Anthemis yemensis Podlech
Anthemis zaianica Oberpr.
Anthemis zoharyana Eig

References

 
Asteraceae genera